Country Christmas is the fourth Christmas album and 78th overall album by American country singer Johnny Cash, released on Laserlight Digital in 1991 (see 1991 in music), in-between Cash's contracts with Mercury Records and American Recordings.

Four tracks do not feature Cash but instead feature vocals by his wife, June Carter Cash and the Carter Family. This was the last Johnny Cash release within his lifetime to feature Carter Family, who had been a staple of his live show and studio recordings since the early 1960s. The sisters would not participate in his upcoming work for American Recordings; nor would June Carter Cash, though a 2000 private release, Return to the Promised Land, would feature her alongside her husband.

Due to this album not having any connection to the Columbia, Mercury or American labels, it is one of the more uncommon Johnny Cash releases and as of 2015 has yet to appear in any box sets or compilations.

Background and content
Most tracks had been previously recorded by Cash for one (or more) of this three prior Columbia Christmas albums, most notably Classic Christmas, though the album also includes several tracks unique to this collection such as a version of Irving Berlin's "White Christmas" featured in the 15-track edition. "Silent Night" is performed on all each of Cash's four canonical Christmas albums. "Figgy Pudding" is an arrangement of the standard "We Wish You a Merry Christmas" with comedic interjections by June Carter Cash, reminiscent of her country-comedy work of the 1950s and 1960s before joining with Johnny Cash.

Reissue
The album was reissued with "White Christmas" and "I'll Be Home for Christmas" removed. In subsequent reissues these songs were replaced by live performances "Ring Of Fire" and "I Walk The Line" despite neither song having anything to do with Christmas. The liner notes do not clarify when the performances took place.

Personnel
 Johnny Cash – Vocals, Guitar
 June Carter – Vocals
 Carter Family – Vocals
 Jack Hale Jr. & His Nashville All-Star Band & Singers – Vocals, Instruments. Hale is also credited as arranger on all of the traditional Christmas songs

Track listing

15-track version

13-track version

2006 reissue
"Silent Night"
"It Came Upon The Midnight Clear"
"Here Was A Man"
"Blue Christmas"
"What Child is This?"
"Joy To The World"
"Ring Of Fire"
"O Christmas Tree"
"Away In A Manger"
"Hark! The Herald Angels Sing"
"O Come All Ye Faithful"
"I Walk The Line"
"Figgy Pudding"
"O Little Town Of Bethlehem"
"The First Noel"

External links

Johnny Cash albums
1991 Christmas albums
Christmas albums by American artists
Country Christmas albums